Moussa Camara (born 12 February 1988, Bamako) is a Malian athlete specializing in the 800 metres.

He competed for Mali at the 2012 Summer Olympics failing to qualify for the semifinals. These were his first Olympics. During this time he trained in Kenya his own country experienced the 2012 Malian coup d'état, which has weighed on him.

Competition record

References 

Living people
1988 births
Malian male middle-distance runners
Olympic athletes of Mali
Athletes (track and field) at the 2012 Summer Olympics
Athletes (track and field) at the 2015 African Games
World Athletics Championships athletes for Mali
Sportspeople from Bamako
African Games competitors for Mali
21st-century Malian people